Henrik Holm and Anders Järryd were the defending champions, but lost in the quarterfinals to Boris Becker and John McEnroe.

Jeremy Bates and Jonas Björkman won in the final 6–4, 6–1, against Jacco Eltingh and Paul Haarhuis.

Seeds

  Jacco Eltingh /  Paul Haarhuis (final)
  Tom Nijssen /  Cyril Suk (first round)
  David Adams /  Andrei Olhovskiy (quarterfinals)
  Martin Damm /  Karel Nováček (first round)

Draw

Draw

External links
Draw
Qualifying draw

Doubles